Dimitrios Mikhas (born 7 June 1958) is a Greek former triple jumper who competed in the 1984 Summer Olympics.

He represented his country at the 1983 World Championships in Athletics, the 1982 European Athletics Championships, and won a gold medal at the 1983 Mediterranean Games.

References

1958 births
Living people
Greek male triple jumpers
Olympic athletes of Greece
Athletes (track and field) at the 1984 Summer Olympics
World Athletics Championships athletes for Greece
Mediterranean Games gold medalists for Greece
Mediterranean Games medalists in athletics
Athletes (track and field) at the 1983 Mediterranean Games
20th-century Greek people